Kosmos 154 ( meaning Cosmos 154), also known as L-1 No.3P, was a Soviet test spacecraft launched from the Baikonur aboard a Proton-K rocket. It was a prototype Soyuz 7K-L1 launched by Proton. It was an uncrewed precursor to the Zond series.

History
The spacecraft was designed to launch a crew from the Earth to conduct a flyby of the Moon and return to Earth. The primary focus was a Soviet circumlunar flight, which help document the Moon, and also show Soviet power. The test ran from the Zond program from 1967-1970, which produced multiple failures in the 7K-L1's re-entry systems. The remaining 7K-L1s were scrapped, ultimately replaced by the Soyuz 7K-L3.

Objectives
Two test flights of the UR-500K/L1 system were performed in March and April 1967 under the designations Kosmos 146 and Kosmos 154. In April 1967, under the cover name Kosmos-154, the third model of the L-1 was placed into near-Earth orbit. Because of a control system failure that resulted in the premature jettisoning of the ullage motors, the main propulsion system of the Block-D did not ignite. Kosmos 154 was one of the first Zond attempts. It was supposed to flyby the Moon but achieved Earth orbit only.

Mission
Kosmos 154 was launched using a Proton-K carrier rocket, which flew from Site 81/23 at Baikonur. The launch occurred at 09:07 GMT on 8 April 1967.

Kosmos 154 reached Earth orbit but the Blok D translunar injection stage failed to fire (ullage rockets, which had to fire to settle propellants in tanks before the main engine fired, were jettisoned prematurely). Kosmos 154 burned up two days later when orbit decayed, on 10 April 1967.

Gallery

References

Soviet space probes
Zond program
1967 in the Soviet Union
Spacecraft launched in 1967